Malcolm Allen (born July 13, 1967) is an American former professional tennis player.

Born in Los Angeles, Allen played college tennis for San Jose State University and as a senior in 1988 won the PCAA singles championship.

From 1988 to 1991 he competed on the international tour, reaching a career best singles ranking of 217 in the world. He qualified for the main draw of the 1989 Australian Open, where he had a first round win over Martin Laurendeau.

References

External links
 
 

1967 births
Living people
American male tennis players
San Jose State Spartans men's tennis players
Tennis people from California